The Giant Gila Monster is a 1959 science fiction horror film directed by Ray Kellogg and produced by Ken Curtis. This low-budget B-movie starred Don Sullivan, a veteran of several low budget monster and zombie films, and Lisa Simone, the French contestant for the 1957 Miss Universe, as well as comedic actor Shug Fisher and KLIF disc jockey Ken Knox. The effects included a live Mexican beaded lizard (not an actual Gila monster) filmed on a scaled-down model landscape.

Plot
The movie opens with a young couple, Pat (Grady Vaughn) and Liz (Yolanda Salas), parked in a bleak, rural locale overlooking a ravine. A giant Gila monster attacks the car, sending it into the ravine and killing the couple. Later, several friends of the couple assist the local sheriff (Fred Graham) in his search for the missing teens. Chase Winstead (Sullivan), a young mechanic and hot rod racer, locates the crashed car in the ravine and finds evidence of the giant lizard. However, it is only when the hungry reptile attacks a train that the authorities realize they are dealing with a giant venomous lizard. By this time, emboldened by its attacks and hungry for prey, the creature attacks the town. It heads for the local dance hall, where the town's teenagers are gathered for a sock hop. However, Chase packs his prized hot rod with nitroglycerin and rigs it to speed straight into the Gila monster, killing it in a fiery explosion and heroically saving the town.

Cast

 Don Sullivan as Chase Winstead
 Lisa Simone as Lisa
 Fred Graham as Sheriff Jeff
 Shug Fisher as Old Man Harris
 Bob Thompson as Mr. Wheeler
 Janice Stone as Missy Winstead
 Ken Knox as Horatio Alger "Steamroller" Smith
 Gay McLendon as Mrs. Winstead
 Don Flournoy as Gordy
 Cecil Hunt as Mr. Compton
 Stormy Meadows as Agatha Humphries
 Howard Ware as Ed Humphries
 Pat Reeves as Rick
 Jan McLendon as Jennie
 Jerry Cortwright as Bob
 Beverly Thurman as Gay
 Clarke Browne as Chuck
 Grady Vaughn as Pat Wheeler
 Desmond Doogh as hitchhiker
 Ann Sonka as Whila
 Yolanda Salas as Liz Humphries
 Patricia Simmons as Sherry (uncredited)
 Angus G. Wynne III as dumb teen (uncredited)

Production
Filmed near Dallas, Texas, the film was budgeted at $175,000 and was produced by Dallas drive-in theater chain owner Gordon McLendon who wanted co-features for his main attractions. McLendon shot the film back to back with The Killer Shrews. Both films were feted as the first feature films shot in and produced in Dallas, and the first movies to premiere as double features. Unlike most double features released in the South, these films received national and even foreign distribution.

In exchange for doing the special effects, Kellogg was allowed to direct the film. Curtis allowed Sullivan to pick the songs with the teenage market in mind. Knox, who played Horatio Alger "Steamroller" Smith, was an actual disc jockey working at radio stations in Texas owned by McLendon. The "Gila monster" in the movie is actually a Mexican beaded lizard.

Reception
On his website Fantastic Movie Musings and Ramblings Dave Sindelar gave the film a positive review, writing, "Whatever flaws there are with the story, I find myself drawn to the regional feel of the movie, and especially to the likable characters that inhabit this environment...It's rare for a movie to have this many likable characters, and I think the reason I watch the movie again and again is because I just like to spend time with them".
TV Guide gave the film 2 out of 5 stars, calling it "a rear-projected monster just doesn't put audiences in a deep state of fear, especially when it's a lizard. It does, however, induce occasional uncontrolled laughter". Alan Jones from Radio Times awarded the film 1 out of 5 stars, calling it "unintentionally amusing rather than scary".

References in popular culture
The film was featured on a season 5 episode of Cinema Insomnia and season 4 of Mystery Science Theater 3000.

A giant Gila monster briefly appears in the Godzilla: The Series episode "Freak Show".

Remake
A made-for-TV remake, Gila!, directed by Jim Wynorski, was released in 2012.

See also
 List of films in the public domain in the United States

References

External links 

 
 
 
 

1959 films
American black-and-white films
American monster movies
American science fiction horror films
Films about lizards
Films scored by Jack Marshall
Giant monster films
1959 horror films
1950s science fiction horror films
1950s monster movies
1959 directorial debut films
1950s English-language films
1950s American films